D31 may refer to:

Ships 
 , a Nueva Esparta-class destroyer of the Venezuelan Navy
 , a Pará-class destroyer of the Brazilian Navy
 , a Cannon-class destroyer of the Hellenic Navy
 , a W-class destroyer  of the Royal Australian Navy
 , a Ruler-class escort carrier of the Royal Navy
 , a Weapon-class destroyer of the Royal Navy
 , a Battle-class destroyer of the Royal Navy

Other uses 
 D31 road (Croatia)
 Dewoitine D.30, a French passenger monoplane
 Druine D.31 Turbulent, a French ultralight aircraft
 LNER Class D31, a class of British steam locomotives